Sydax is a genus of beetles in the family Cerambycidae, containing the following species:

 Sydax amazonicus Martins, 1971
 Sydax confragus Martins, 1971
 Sydax gibbus Joly, 1985
 Sydax inexpectatus Martins, 1981
 Sydax stramineus Lacordaire, 1869

References

Neoibidionini